Media Space is a  exhibition space at the London Science Museum, developed in association with the National Media Museum.

Opened in September 2013, the space comprises an extensive gallery surrounded by cultural spaces for display and participation, for mixing across the arts, sciences and creative industries. It also intended to be a showcase for the National Media Museum collections in photography, as well as cinematography and broadcast technology, and an arena where audiences will engage with how new technologies have impacted on today’s creative industries. It is intended for adult audiences.

Exhibitions
2013/2014: Only in England: Photographs by Tony Ray-Jones and Martin Parr. Photographs by Tony Ray-Jones and Martin Parr. With material from the National Media Museum's Ray-Jones archive curated by Martin Parr and Greg Hobson.
2015: Revelations: Experiments in Photography. Toured to National Media Museum, Bradford. Curated by Greg Hobson and Ben Burbridge.
 2015/2016: Julia Margaret Cameron: Influence and Intimacy. Photographs by Julia Margaret Cameron.
 2015/2016: Gathered Leaves: Photographs by Alec Soth. Photographs and books by Alec Soth. Curated by Kate Bush.

References

External links

Science Museum, London
Art museums established in 2013
Photography museums and galleries in England
Mass media museums in the United Kingdom
Art museums and galleries in London
Tourist attractions in the Royal Borough of Kensington and Chelsea